A grain elevator is a facility designed to stockpile or store grain. In the grain trade, the term "grain elevator" also describes a tower containing a bucket elevator or a pneumatic conveyor, which scoops up grain from a lower level and deposits it in a silo or other storage facility.

In most cases, the term "grain elevator" also describes the entire elevator complex, including receiving and testing offices, weighbridges, and storage facilities. It may also mean organizations that operate or control several individual elevators, in different locations. In Australia, the term describes only the lifting mechanism. 

Before the advent of the grain elevator, grain was usually handled in bags rather than in bulk (large quantities of loose grain). Dart's Elevator was a major innovation. It was invented by Joseph Dart, a merchant, and Robert Dunbar, an engineer, in 1842 and 1843, in Buffalo, New York. Using the steam-powered flour mills of Oliver Evans as their model, they invented the marine leg, which scooped loose grain out of the hulls of ships and elevated it to the top of a marine tower.

Early grain elevators and bins were often built of framed or cribbed wood, and were prone to fire. Grain elevator bins, tanks, and silos are now usually made of steel or reinforced concrete. Bucket elevators are used to lift grain to a distributor or consignor, from which it falls through spouts and/or conveyors and into one or more bins, silos, or tanks in a facility. When desired, silos, bins, and tanks are emptied by gravity flow, sweep augers, and conveyors. As grain is emptied from bins, tanks, and silos, it is conveyed, blended, and weighted into trucks, railroad cars, or barges for shipment.

Usage and definitions

In Australian English, the term "grain elevator" is reserved for elevator towers, while a receival and storage building or complex is distinguished by the formal term "receival point" or as a "wheat bin" or "silo". Large-scale grain receival, storage, and logistics operations are known in Australia as bulk handling.

In Canada, the term "grain elevator" is used to refer to a place where farmers sell grain into the global grain distribution system, and/or a place where the grain is moved into rail cars or ocean-going ships for transport. Specifically, several types of grain elevators are defined under Canadian law, in the Canadian Grain Act, section 2.
 Primary elevators (called "country elevators" before 1971) receive grain directly from producers for storage, forwarding, or both.
 Process elevators (called "mill elevators" before 1971) receive and store grain for direct manufacture or processing into other products.
 Terminal elevators receive grain on or after official inspection and weighing and clean, store, and treat grain before moving it forward.
 Transfer elevators (including "Eastern elevators" from the pre-1971 classification) transfer grain that has been officially inspected and weighed at another elevator. In the Eastern Division, transfer elevators also receive, clean, and store eastern or foreign grain.

History

Both necessity and the prospect of making money  gave birth to the steam-powered grain elevator in Buffalo, New York, in 1843. Due to the completion of the Erie Canal in 1825, Buffalo enjoyed a unique position in American geography. It stood at the intersection of two great all-water routes; one extended from New York Harbor, up the Hudson River to Albany, and beyond it, the Port of Buffalo; the other comprised the Great Lakes, which could theoretically take boaters in any direction they wished to go (north to Canada, west to Michigan or Wisconsin, south to Toledo and Cleveland, or east to the Atlantic Ocean). All through the 1830s, Buffalo benefited tremendously from its position. In particular, it was the recipient of most of the increasing quantities of grain (mostly wheat) that was being grown on farms in Ohio and Indiana, and shipped on Lake Erie for trans-shipment to the Erie Canal. If Buffalo had not been there, or when things got backed up there, that grain would have been loaded onto boats at Cincinnati and shipped down the Mississippi River to New Orleans.

By 1842,  Buffalo's port facilities clearly had become antiquated. They still relied upon techniques that had been in use since the European Middle Ages; work teams of stevedores use block and tackles and their own backs to unload or load each sack of grain that had been stored ashore or in the boat's hull. Several days, sometimes even a week, were needed to serve a single grain-laden boat. Grain shipments were going down the Mississippi River, not over the Great Lakes/Erie Canal system.

A merchant named Joseph Dart Jr., is generally credited as being the one who adapted Oliver Evans' grain elevator (originally a manufacturing device) for use in a commercial framework (the trans-shipment of grain in bulk from lakers to canal boats), but the actual design and construction of the world's first steam-powered "grain storage and transfer warehouse" was executed by an engineer named Robert Dunbar. Thanks to the historic Dart's Elevator (operational on 1 June 1843), which worked almost seven times faster than its nonmechanized predecessors, Buffalo was able to keep pace with—and thus further stimulate—the rapid growth of American agricultural production in the 1840s and 1850s, but especially after the Civil War, with the coming of the railroads.

The world's second and third grain elevators were built in Toledo, Ohio, and Brooklyn, New York, in 1847. These fledgling American cities were connected through an emerging international grain trade of unprecedented proportions. Grain shipments from farms in Ohio were loaded onto ships by elevators at Toledo; these ships were unloaded by elevators at Buffalo that shipped their grain to canal boats (and, later, rail cars), which were unloaded by elevators in Brooklyn, where the grain was either distributed to East Coast flour mills or loaded for further shipment to England, the Netherlands, or Germany. This eastern flow of grain, though,  was matched by an equally important flow of people and capital in the opposite direction, that is, from east to west. Because of the money to be made in grain production, and of course, because of the existence of an all-water route to get there, increasing numbers of immigrants in Brooklyn came to Ohio, Indiana, and Illinois to become farmers. More farmers meant more prairies turned into farmlands, which in turn meant increased grain production, which of course meant that more grain elevators would have to be built in places such as Toledo, Buffalo, and Brooklyn (and Cleveland, Chicago, and Duluth). Through this loop of productivity set in motion by the invention of the grain elevator, the United States became a major international producer of wheat, corn, and oats.

In the early 20th century,  concern arose about monopolistic practices in the grain elevator industry, leading to testimony before the Interstate Commerce Commission in 1906. This led to several grain elevators being burned down in Nebraska, allegedly in protest.

Today, grain elevators are a common sight in the grain-growing areas of the world, such as the North American prairies. Larger terminal elevators are found at distribution centers, such as Chicago and Thunder Bay, Ontario, where grain is sent for processing, or loaded aboard trains or ships to go further afield.

Buffalo, New York, the world's largest grain port from the 1850s until the first half of the 20th century, once had the United States' largest capacity for the storage of grain in over 30 concrete grain elevators located along the inner and outer harbors. While several are still in productive use, many of those that remain are presently idle. In a nascent trend, some of the city's inactive capacity has recently come back online, with an ethanol plant started in 2007 using one of the previously mothballed elevators to store corn. In the early 20th century, Buffalo's grain elevators inspired modernist architects such as Le Corbusier, who exclaimed, "The first fruits of the new age!" when he first saw them. Buffalo's grain elevators have been documented for the Historic American Engineering Record and added to the National Register of Historic Places. Currently, Enid, Oklahoma, holds the title of most grain storage capacity in the United States.

In farming communities, each town had one or more small grain elevators that served the local growers. The classic grain elevator was constructed with wooden cribbing and had nine or more larger square or rectangular bins arranged in 3 × 3 or 3 × 4 or 4 × 4 or more patterns. Wooden-cribbed elevators usually had a driveway with truck scale and office on one side, a rail line on the other side, and additional grain-storage annex bins on either side.

In more recent times with improved transportation, centralized and much larger elevators serve many farms. Some of them are quite large. Two elevators in Kansas (one in Hutchinson and one in Wichita) are half a mile long. The loss of the grain elevators from small towns is often considered a great change in their identity, and efforts to preserve them as heritage structures are made. At the same time, many larger grain farms have their own grain-handling facilities for storage and loading onto trucks.

Elevator operators buy grain from farmers, either for cash or at a contracted price, and then sell futures contracts for the same quantity of grain, usually each day. They profit through the narrowing "basis", that is, the difference between the local cash price, and the futures price, that occurs at certain times of the year.

Before economical truck transportation was available, grain elevator operators sometimes used their purchasing power to control prices. This was especially easy, since farmers often had only one elevator  within a reasonable distance of their farms. This led some governments to take over the administration of grain elevators. An example of this is the Saskatchewan Wheat Pool. For the same reason, many elevators were purchased by cooperatives.

A recent problem with grain elevators is the need to provide separate storage for ordinary and genetically modified grain to reduce the risk of accidental mixing of the two.

In the past, grain elevators sometimes experienced silo explosions. Fine powder from the millions of grains passing through the facility would accumulate and mix with the oxygen in the air. A spark could spread from one floating particle to the other, creating a chain reaction that would destroy the entire structure. (This dispersed-fuel explosion is the mechanism behind fuel-air bombs.) To prevent this, elevators have very rigorous rules against smoking or any other open flame. Many elevators also have various devices installed to maximize ventilation, safeguards against overheating in belt conveyors, legs, bearings, and explosion-proof electrical devices such as electric motors, switches, and lighting.

Grain elevators in small Canadian communities often had the name of the community painted on two sides of the elevator in large block letters, with the name of the elevator operator emblazoned on the other two sides. This made identification of the community easier for rail operators (and incidentally, for lost drivers and pilots). The old community name often remained on an elevator long after the town had either disappeared or been amalgamated into another community; the grain elevator at Ellerslie, Alberta, remained marked with its old community name until it was demolished, which took place more than 20 years after the village had been annexed by Edmonton.

One of the major historical trends in the grain trade has been the closure of many smaller elevators, and the consolidation the grain trade to fewer places and among fewer companies. For example, in 1961, 1,642 "country elevators" (the smallest type) were in Alberta, holding  of grain. By 2010. only 79 "primary elevators" (as they are now known) remained, holding .

In 2017, the United States had  of storage capacity, a growth of 25% in the previous decade.

Elevator Alley

The city of Buffalo is not only the birthplace of the modern grain elevator, but also has the world's largest number of extant examples. A number of the city's historic elevators are clustered along "Elevator Alley", a narrow stretch of the Buffalo River immediately adjacent to the harbor. The alley runs under Ohio Street and along Childs Street in the city's First Ward neighborhood.

Elevator row

In Canada, the term "elevator row" refers to a row of four or more wood-crib prairie grain elevators.

In the early pioneer days of Western Canada's prairie towns, when a good farming spot was settled, many people wanted to make money by building their own grain elevators. This brought in droves of private grain companies. Towns boasted dozens of elevator companies, which all stood in a row along the railway tracks. If a town were lucky enough to have two railways, it was to be known as the next Montreal. Many elevator rows had two or more elevators of the same company. Small towns bragged of their large elevator rows in promotional pamphlets to attract settlers. With so much competition in the 1920s, consolidation began almost immediately, and many small companies were merged or absorbed into larger companies.

In the mid-1990s, with the cost of grain so low, many private elevator companies once again had to merge, this time causing thousands of "prairie sentinels" to be torn down. Because so many grain elevators have been torn down, Canada has only two surviving elevator rows; one located in Inglis, Manitoba, and the other in Warner, Alberta. The Inglis Grain Elevators National Historic Site has been protected as a National Historic Sites of Canada. The Warner elevator row is, as of 2019, not designated a historic site, and is still in use as commercial grain elevators.

Elevator companies

Australia
 ABB Grain was founded as a mutual company, the Australian Barley Board, in 1939, by barley growers in South Australia and Victoria; after demutualization, it was acquired by Viterra (see below) in 2009; Australian Bulk Alliance, a joint venture between ABB and Sumitomo, operates facilities in some areas.
 CBH Group, a co-operative company, was established by grain growers in Western Australia, in 1933.
 GrainCorp was established by the government of New South Wales in 1917, as Government Grain Elevator, and was privatized in 1992.

Canada
All companies operating elevators in Canada are licensed by the Canadian Grain Commission.

 Agricore United was taken over by Saskatchewan Wheat Pool in 2007.
 Alberta Farmers' Co-operative Elevator Company merged into United Grain Growers in 1917.
 Alberta Pacific Grain Company was taken over by Federal Grain Co. in 1967.
 Alberta Wheat Pool merged with Manitoba Pool Elevators in 1997.
 Cargill was established in 1865 by W.W. Cargill.
 Federal Grain was sold to the three provincial wheat pools in 1972.
 Grain Growers' Grain Company merged into United Grain Growers in 1917.
 Lake of the Woods Milling Company
 Manitoba Pool Elevators  merged with Alberta Wheat Pool in 1997.
 Parrish & Heimbecker was established in 1909 by the two families of William Parrish and Norman G. Heimbecker.
 Paterson Grain was established in 1908 as the N. M. Paterson Co.
 Richardson International was established in 1857 by James Richardson; it is also known as Richardson Pioneer.
 Saskatchewan Co-operative Elevator Company was taken over by the Saskatchewan Wheat Pool in 1926.
 Saskatchewan Wheat Pool took over Agricore United in 2007 to form Viterra.
 United Grain Growers was taken over by Agricore United in 2001.
 Viterra was established after the take-over of Agricore United by the Saskatchewan Wheat Pool.

Sweden
 In Sweden, the vast majority of grain elevators belong to the Lantmännen co-operative movement, owned by grain-growing farmers.

United States

 ADM Milling
 Cargill
 General Mills
 Monarch Engineering Co. (builder)
 Montana Elevator Co.
 Perdue Agribusiness
 Scoular
 Smithfield Grain
 Southern States Cooperative
 Tyson
 United Grain Growers

Notable grain elevators
During the Battle of Stalingrad, one particularly well-defended Soviet strongpoint was known simply as "the Grain Elevator" and was strategically important to both sides.

This is a list of grain elevators that are either in the process of becoming heritage sites or museums, or have been preserved for future generations.

Canada

Alberta

 Acadia Valley – Prairie Elevator Museum, former Alberta Wheat Pool converted into a tea house and museum
 Alberta Central Railroad Museum – former Alberta Wheat Pool, second-oldest standing grain elevator in Alberta, moved from Hobbema
 Andrew – former Alberta Wheat Pool, restored into a museum
 Castor – former Alberta Pacific, restored into a museum
 Big Valley – Alberta Wheat Pool used as a museum complete with a train station and roundhouse
 Edmonton – Ritchie Mill, former flour mill converted into restaurants, law offices, and condominiums
 Ellis Bird Farm, built in 1937, oldest standing seed elevator in Alberta
 Esther – former Alberta Wheat Pool, restored into a museum
 Haselwood Mill – Alberta's oldest seed-cleaning mill, second on the site, privately owned, not protected, operated from the 1930s to 1960s near Bittern Lake, Alberta
 Heritage Acres Farm Museum – restored United Grain Growers elevator moved from Brocket
 Heritage Park Historical Village, former Security Elevator Co. Ltd. moved from Shonts
 Kinuso – United Grain Growers with original UGG logo
 Leduc – former Alberta Wheat Pool saved from demolition now a museum
 Lougheed – former Pioneer Elevator,now part of the Iron Creek Museum
 Mayerthorpe – 1966 Federal Grain Co., now an interpretive center
 Meeting Creek – a refurbished Alberta Wheat Pool, Pacific Grain elevator and CN train station
 Nanton – Canadian Grain Elevator Discovery Centre, three elevators saved from demolition and preserved to educate visitors about the town's, and Alberta's, agricultural history
 Radway – Krause Milling Co. restored into a museum
 Raley – oldest standing grain elevator on its original site in Alberta, built in 1909, maintaining many of its original features
 Rowley – United Grain Growers and Alberta Wheat Pool elevators saved from demolition by locals and now fully restored
 Scandia – Scandia Eastern Irrigation District Museum, 1920s Alberta Wheat Pool and stockyard now a museum
 South Peace Centennial Museum, United Grain Growers moved from Albright
 Spruce Grove – Spruce Grove Grain Elevator Museum, former Alberta Wheat Pool, now a museum
 St. Albert – St. Albert Grain Elevator Park, a 1906 Alberta Grain Co. and 1929 Alberta Wheat Pool Elevators now restored as a historic park
 Stettler – a 1920 Parrish and Heimbecker grain elevator, feed mill, and coal shed, last to stand in Alberta, now protected and restored as a museum
 Ukrainian Cultural Heritage Village – former Home Grain Co. moved from Bellis

British Columbia
 Creston – former Alberta Wheat Pool (1936) and United Grain Growers (1937) elevators that still stand tall on the edge of the downtown core in the middle of the Creston Valley
 Dawson Creek – restored and refurbished as a community art gallery

Manitoba

 Inglis – Inglis elevator row, last surviving elevator row in Manitoba with a total of four elevators. Now designated and protected as a National Historic Site of Canada
 Niverville – Western Canada's first grain elevator, erected by William Hespeler in 1879
 Plum Coulee – grain elevator refurbished as a restaurant and meeting rooms

Ontario
 Scugog – Canada's oldest grain elevator and the second oldest in all of the Americas
 Stiver Mills – one of a few surviving grain elevators in Ontario, built 1916 and used until 1968 and now a farmers' market

Quebec
 Silo No. 5, Montreal – This grain elevator was completed in four stages from 1906 to 1959 and was abandoned in 1994. With the demolition of Silo No. 1 and Silo No. 2, Silo No. 5 is now, along with the Old Port’s conveyor pier tower, the last vestige of Old Montreal’s 20th-century harbour panorama.

Saskatchewan
 Edam – former Saskatchewan Wheat Pool now a museum
 Gravelbourg – Former Saskatchewan Wheat Pool saved from demolition and now a museum
 Indian Head – experimental farm grain elevator refurbished as a Café, coffee house
 Sukanen Ship Pioneer Village and Museum – former Victoria – McCabe moved from Mawer
 Val Marie – former Federal and 1967 Centennial Saskatchewan Wheat Pool now museums
 North Battleford Western Development Museum, former Saskatchewan Wheat Pool moved from Keatley
 Weyburn Inland Terminal – first large farmer owned inland terminal in Canada, constructed in 1975 located near Weyburn
 Wood Mountain – former Saskatchewan Wheat Pool No. 706, demolished April 22, 2014

South Africa
 Port of Cape Town – once the tallest building in Cape Town, now restored to become the Zeitz Museum of Contemporary Art Africa

Switzerland

United Kingdom
The Manchester Ship Canal grain elevator was completed in 1898.  It had a capacity of 40,000 tons and its automatic conveying and spouting system could distribute grain into 226 bins.

United States

Baltimore, Maryland

Buffalo, New York
 American Grain Complex, built between 1905 and 1931
 Cargill Superior elevator, marked as Cargill "S", built between 1914 and 1925
 Concrete-Central Elevator, Buffalo, New York – The largest transfer elevator in the world at the time of its completion in 1917
 Connecting Terminal, Clearly visible from across canalside and the Commercial Slip the structure is now used for boat storage
 General Mills Plant, or "The Frontier Elevator" General Mills Buffalo factory is a large scale grain mill and cereal production facility, most notably producing Gold Medal brand flour, Wheaties, Cheerios, and other General Mills brand cereals
 Great Northern Elevator, built in 1897 by the Great Northern Railroad; currently being demolished
 Lake & Rail Grain Elevator, part of the "elevator alley" – The Lake and Rail produces over 2,700,00 pounds of flour a day
 Marine A grain elevator, also part of the "elevator alley" and across from the Lake & Rail Grain Elevator
 The Standard Elevator – named after the Standard Milling Company and built in 1926
 Wheeler Elevator – also known as the Agway/GLF East Work House, built in 1908
 Wollenberg Grain and Seed Elevator – wooden "country style" elevator formerly located in Buffalo, New York; destroyed by fire in October 2006

Wassaic, New York
 Maxon Mills – built in 1954 and remained in active use as a feed elevator until the 1980s. The mill was placed on the New York State Register of Historic Places and restored in the early 2000s. It is currently used as a contemporary art exhibition space by The Wassaic Project

Illinois
 Armour's Warehouse – constructed in 1861–62 on the north bank of the Illinois-Michigan Canal in Seneca, Illinois

Iowa
 Bouton, Iowa's grain elevator – owned by Susan (formerly Flanery) & Michael Chris Brelsford, photo shoot location for the 40th Anniversary Sports Illustrated Swimsuit Issue (2004)

Minnesota
 Northwestern Consolidated Milling Company Elevator A, also known as the Ceresota Building and "The Million Bushel Elevator", was a receiving and public grain elevator built by the Northwestern Consolidated Milling Company in 1908 in Minneapolis, Minnesota
 Peavey–Haglin Experimental Concrete Grain Elevator, St. Louis Park, Minnesota, built in 1899–1900
 Saint Paul Municipal Grain Terminal, in St. Paul, Minnesota, on the NRHP

North Dakota
 North Dakota Mill and Elevator, largest flour mill in the United States, located in Grand Forks, North Dakota

Oklahoma
 Bricktown, Oklahoma City, Oklahoma is home to OKC Rocks, a former grain elevator that has been turned into an indoor rock-climbing facility located in Oklahoma City.
 Ingersoll Tile Elevator, elevator constructed of hollow red clay tiles, located in Ingersoll, Oklahoma

Philadelphia, Pennsylvania
 Reading Company Grain Elevator, export elevator in Philadelphia converted into offices

South Dakota
 Zip Feed Tower, tallest occupiable structure in South Dakota from its construction in 1956–1957 until its demolition in December 2005

Virginia
 Groh's Grain Elevator, elevator located near the York River in Clay Bank, Virginia.  The concrete elevator with 14 silos was built in 1950 at a cost of $150,000 (equal to over $1.6 million in 2021) by Louis Groh and Son, Inc. The waterfront property containing the long abandoned elevator is owned by a local physician who has installed a wind turbine atop the towering structure to generate electricity.
 Sewell's Point grain elevator, export elevator built by the city of Norfolk in 1922 to help the port of Norfolk better compete with other East Coast ports by providing a publicly owned facility to store and load grain at reasonable rates. It was sold to the Norfolk and Western railroad in 1929, and leased from N&W by Continental grain in 1952. The elevator was taken over by Cargill in the late 1980s and abandoned around the turn of the 21st century. The elevator was demolished by Norfolk Southern in 2008.
 Southern States silos, a grain elevator in Richmond, Virginia originally built in the 1940s by Cargill, and currently leased by Perdue Farms is the tallest structure south of the James River in the city of Richmond. The elevator was the site of the 3rd RVA Street Art Festival.

Wisconsin
 Chase Grain Elevator, tile grain elevator built in 1922. Sun Prairie, Wisconsin Placed on the National Register of Historic Places in 2010. It is the last remaining tile elevator in Wisconsin.

Wyoming
 Sheridan Flouring Mills, Inc., an industrial complex in Sheridan, Wyoming

Elevator explosions

Given a large enough suspension of combustible flour or grain dust in the air, a significant explosion can occur. A historical example of the destructive power of grain explosions is the 1878 explosion of the Washburn "A" Mill in Minneapolis, Minnesota, which killed 18, leveled two nearby mills, damaged many others, and caused a destructive fire that gutted much of the nearby milling district. (The Washburn "A" mill was later rebuilt and continued to be used until 1965.) Another example occurred in 1998, when the DeBruce grain elevator in Wichita, Kansas, exploded and killed seven people. A recent example is an explosion on October 29, 2011 at the Bartlett Grain Company in Atchison, Kansas. The death toll was six people. Two more men received severe burns, but the remaining four were not hurt.

Almost any finely divided organic substance becomes an explosive material when dispersed as an air suspension; hence, a very fine flour is dangerously explosive in air suspension. This poses a significant risk when milling grain to produce flour, so mills go to great lengths to remove sources of sparks. These measures include carefully sifting the grain before it is milled or ground to remove stones, which could strike sparks from the millstones, and the use of magnets to remove metallic debris able to strike sparks.

The earliest recorded flour explosion took place in an Italian mill in 1785, but many have occurred since. These two references give numbers of recorded flour and dust explosions in the United States in 1994: and 1997 In the ten-year period up to and including 1997, there were 129 explosions.

Media

Canadian Prairie grain elevators were the subjects of the National Film Board of Canada documentaries Grain Elevator and Death of a Skyline.

During the sixth season of the History Channel series Ax Men, one of the featured crews takes on the job of dismantling the Globe Elevator in Wisconsin. This structure was the largest grain-storage facility in the world when it was built in the 1880s.

See also

 Silo
 Grain entrapment
 Granary
 Dust explosion
 List of grain elevators

References

External links

 Grain elevators in West Texas
 Complete Photographic Record of the Remaining Canadian Prairie Grain Elevators
 Vanishing Landmarks: Photographs of standing and demolished Grain Elevators with information and maps.
 Grain Elevators: Buffalo's Lost Industry
 Buffalo Grain Elevators: A bibliography by The Buffalo History Museum
 Bruce Selyem, Grain Elevator Photographer
 Pixelgrain: Mapping Transition in the Canadian Prairies
 "Inside a Modern Grain Elevator" Popular Science Monthly, February 1930, p. 45. Drawing of how 1930s grain elevator worked at sea ports.
 Our Grandfathers' Grain Elevators blog with specifications of reinforced-concrete elevators

 
Grain production